Prezid  may refer to:

 Prezid, Slovenia, a village in Slovenia
 Prezid, Croatia, a village in Croatia